Dionne Monsanto-Stalder (born December 5, 1985) is a former Filipino actress.

Career
Monsanto appeared on Pinoy Big Brother: Season 2 as a contestant in 2007. Monsanto entered on Day 12 of the series, and was evicted on Day 77.
In the later part of 2007, Monsanto portrayed Salonna in Super Inggo 1.5: Ang Bagong Bangis, the series starring former child actor Makisig Morales. Monsanto's next television appearance was in 2008, when she starred in the TV series, Lobo. In 2009, she portrayed Grace Palacios in George and Cecil. and appeared as Jenny in a Philippine remake of Lovers in Paris. In 2015, Monsanto appeared in FlordeLiza, Pasión de amor and in the film Swap. In 2016, Monsanto appeared in the daytime TV series Tubig at Langis, her character Lucy Villadolid would later feature in memes.

On February 25, 2021, Monsanto announced her retirement so that she can emigrate to Switzerland, her husband's native country. On April 18, 2022, she gave birth to a baby girl with her husband Ryan Stalder.

Filmography

Television

Film

References

External links

1985 births
Living people
Actresses from Cebu
Cebuano television actresses
Cebuano film actresses
Star Magic
Pinoy Big Brother contestants
Filipino expatriates in Switzerland